Eudorylas caledonicus is a species of fly in the family Pipunculidae.

Distribution
Scotland.

References

Pipunculidae
Insects described in 1999
Diptera of Europe